Rock Pond may refer to:

 Rock Pond (Old Forge, New York)
 Rock Pond (Thendara, New York)